The Chicago White Sox Radio Network is an American radio network airing baseball games from the Chicago White Sox. The English-language flagship is WMVP in Chicago, with Spanish language coverage airing on WRTO (1200). The English language network consists of 19 stations For the 2019 season, the play-by-play announcers were Ed Farmer and Jason Benetti (who joins the broadcast team for national broadcasts and for White Sox's games where Ken Harrelson and Chuck Swirsky fills-in for him); the color commentator was Darrin Jackson. Farmer died on April 1, 2020 after a long-term battle with polycystic kidney disease. Pre-game host Andy Masur substituted for Farmer during 2020's truncated spring training, and was named as Farmer's successor on June 30, 2020, a role that would be temporary due to the team's radio rights expiring at the end of the season.

WSCR's contract with the White Sox expired after the 2015 season. WLS (890) was to be the new White Sox flagship station from the 2016 through the 2021 seasons; however, WLS owner Cumulus Media filed for Chapter 11 bankruptcy protection in November 2017 and entered into a restructuring agreement with certain of its lenders to reduce more than $1 billion in debt. The Bankruptcy Court allowed Cumulus and WLS to end its contract with the White Sox. WGN became the new flagship station of the Chicago White Sox on February 14, 2018. WGN's contract expired after the 2020 season, with WMVP, an ESPN Radio-owned station operated by Good Karma Brands, taking over beginning with the 2021 season, WMVP had previously carried the White Sox for 11 seasons between 1995 and 2005. Shortly thereafter, Len Kasper, formerly the television voice for the Chicago Cubs, was hired as the radio play-by-play announcer for the White Sox. Connor McKnight succeeded Masur as pre-game host and fill-in play-by-play announcer.

Station list

Flagships

Affiliates

Illinois

Indiana

Iowa

References

External links 

Chicago White Sox
Major League Baseball on the radio
Sports radio networks in the United States